The Texas Longhorns women's tennis team began play in 1978, and since then has won four NCAA Championships (1993, 1995, 2021, and 2022), 23 regular-season conference titles (three shared), 11 Big 12 tournaments, and all nine SWC tournament championships. The Longhorns were also the NCAA runner-up in 1992 and 2005.

Head coach
Source

Yearly Record
Source

Conference Singles Champions

Big 12
Source

Conference Doubles Champions

Big 12
Source

See also
Texas Longhorns men's tennis

References